Martin Carlin (c. 1730–1785) was a Parisian ébéniste (cabinet-maker), born at Freiburg, who was received as Master Ébéniste at Paris on 30 July 1766. Renowned for his "graceful furniture mounted with Sèvres porcelain", Carlin fed into the luxury market of eighteenth-century decorative arts, where porcelain-fitted furniture was considered among "the most exquisite furnishings" within the transitional and neoclassical styles. Carlin's furniture was popular amongst the main great dealers, including Poirier, Daguerre, and Darnault, who sold his furniture to Marie Antoinette and many amongst the social elite class. He died on 6 March 1785.

Work life 
Carlin worked at first in the shop of Jean-François Oeben, whose sister he married. The marriage contract reveals that "Carlin was still a day-worker living on the quai des Célestins". Yet soon after Oeben's death, Carlin started to sell furniture to the marchands-merciers when setting up independently in the Faubourg Saint-Antoine. This was however an unfashionable quarter of Paris, where few of his wealthy clientele would have penetrated. Therefore, Carlin found it necessary to sell his works exclusively to marchands-merciers such as Simon-Philippe Poirier and his partner Dominique Daguerre, who acted as decorative-designers. It was only through these entrepreneurs that Carlin could acquire the Sèvres porcelain plaques that decorated many of his pieces. His earliest such pieces can be dated by the marks on their porcelain to 1766; they followed designs supplied by the dealer Poirier. The great dealers also possessed an expansive network of the monarchy and much of the nobility, and thus sold Carlin's furniture to figures such as, Marie Antoinette, the comte de Provence, the comte d'Artois, Louis XV's daughters, the mesdames de France, Madame du Barry, and the duchesse de Mazarin.

For 12 years after becoming Master Ebéniste, he made porcelain-mounted furniture for Poirier and after 1778, he fed into the popular taste for exotic, 'oriental' designs and materials, and therefore started to produce sumptuous pieces in Japanese lacquer.

Collection
Although Martin Carlin made some larger pieces— secrétaires à abattant (drop-front secretary desks), tables, and commodes— he is best known for refined small furnishings in the neoclassical taste, some of them veneered with cut up panels of Chinese lacquer, which he would also have received from the hands of the marchands-merciers.

Bonheur du jour (Table à gradin dite) 

Bonheur du jour, 1765, Bowes Museum, UK
Bonheur du jour, 1766, Musée Nissim de Camondo, France
Bonheur du jour, 1768, Boughton House, UK
Bonheur du jour, 1768, delivered to the Comtesse du Barry, The Metropolitan Museum of Art, United States
Bonheur du jour, 1769, The Metropolitan Museum of Art, United States
Bonheur du jour, 1770, The Metropolitan Museum of Art, United States
Bonheur du jour, 1770, The Huntington Library, United States
Bonheur du jour, 1771, The Huntington Library, United States
Bonheur du jour, 1774, The Metropolitan Museum of Art, United States

Bureau plat (Writing table) 

Bureau plat, 1778, delivered to the Grand Duchess Maria Feodorovna and Grand Duke Paul Petrovich of Russia for the Palace of Pavlosk, Getty Museum, United States

Cabinet 

Cabinet, c. 1783, Royal Collection, UK

Coffret à bijoux 

Coffret à bijoux, 1770, delivered to Marie-Antoinette for the Petit Triannon, Château de Versailles, France
Coffret à bijoux, c. 1770, delivered to the Comtesse du Barry, The Metropolitan Museum of Art, United States
Coffret à bijoux, c. 1774, delivered to the Grand Duchess Maria Feodorovna and Grand Duke Paul Petrovich of Russia for the Palace of Pavlosk, The Detroit Institute of Arts, United States
Coffret à bijoux, c. 1775, The Metropolitan Museum of Art, United States
Coffret à bijoux, c. 1775, The Metropolitan Museum of Art, United States

Commode à vantaux (Commode with doors) 

Commode à vantaux, c. 1778, inset with Pietra Dure panels (one of Carlin's greatest examples), Royal Collection, UK

Encoignure (Corner cabinet) 

Pair of Encoignures, 1772, Wallace Collection, UK

Music-stand 

 Music-stand and writing table, c. 1775, Waddesdon Manor, UK
Music-stand, 1770-75, Getty Museum, United States

Music-stand and writing-table 

Music-stand and writing-table, 1786, given by Marie-Antoinette to Mrs William Eden (later Lady Auckland), V&A, UK

Reading stand 

Reading stand, c. 1780, V&A, UK

Secrétaire 

Secrétaire, 1775, Getty Museum, United States
Secrétaire, 1776, Wallace Collection, UK
Secrétaire, 1776-77, Getty Museum, United States

Secrétaire à abattant 

 Secrétaire à abattant, 1776, Waddesdon Manor, UK
Secrétaire à abattant, 1770-80, V&A, UK

Table à ouvrage 

Table à ouvrage, 1770. delivered to the duchesse de Mazarin in 1779 for her dressing room, Getty Museum, United States
Table à ouvrage, 1773, Getty Museum, United States
Table à ouvrage, 1775, V&A, UK
Table à ouvrage, 1783-84, Wallace Collection, UK
Table à ouvrage, 1786, given by Marie-Antoinette to Mrs William Eden (later Lady Auckland), V&A, UK

See also
 Louis XVI furniture

Notes

References
Svend Eriksen, Early Neo-Classicism in France pp 159 (bio.)

Further reading
 (see index: p. 127-128; illustrations: p. 28, 50, 60–61)

External links

(Getty Museum): Martin Carlin
(Metropolitan Museum of Art) Bonheur-du-jour with Sèvres plaques, 1768
(Detroit Institute of Arts) Jewel Cabinet, about 1774, accession #71.196
(Royal Collection) Commode, ca 1778, with panels of pietra dura.
(Waddesdon Manor): Martin Carlin
YouTube, Combined music stand and writing table made by Martin Carlin, 1775

French furniture makers
1730s births
1785 deaths
Waddesdon Manor